Mirjana Lučić was the defending champion, but lost in the quarterfinals to Regina Kulikova. 
Regina Kulikova won the title by defeating Anna Tatishvili in the final 7–5, 6–3.

Seeds

Main draw

Finals

Top half

Bottom half

References
 Main Draw
 Qualifying Draw

Coleman Vision Tennis Championships - Singles
Coleman Vision Tennis Championships
2011 Coleman Vision Tennis Championships